The Boy James is a play written by Alexander Wright that opened in 2010 at the Edinburgh Fringe Festival and featured as part of Belt Up Theatre's 2010 Edinburgh season, The House Above.

Directed by Dominic Allen and produced by Jethro Compton, the play has since been performed in London, across the United Kingdom, and has returned to Edinburgh as part of the Belt Up Theatre 2011 season. Critical and public acclaim has led to the show being the longest running of Belt Up Theatre's repertoire, and was one of the two shows that were part of their international debut in the Adelaide Fringe Festival, in 2012 (alongside Outland).

The Play
Inspired by the life and work of J. M. Barrie, The Boy James is the story of one boy’s awakening to the harsh realities of adulthood. The play invites the audience to join James as he escapes these harsh realities by traveling in his mind back to Neverland.

The Boy James is presented by Belt Up Theatre, who The Observer says are "changing the future of British theatre," and whom Time Out London call "fringe royalty."

Characters
 "The Boy"
 "The Girl"
 "James"

Cast

2010: Original Edinburgh cast
 Jethro Compton as The Boy
 Veronica Hare as The Girl
 James Wilkes as James

2011: London and Touring cast
 Jethro Compton as The Boy
 Lucy Farrett as The Girl
 James Wilkes as James

2011: Edinburgh cast
 Jethro Compton as The Boy
 Lucy Farrett as The Girl
 Dan Wood as James

2012: London and international cast
 Jethro Compton as The Boy
 Serena Manteghi as The Girl
 Dominic Allen as James

2015: Castle Theatre Company, Durham University
 George Rexstrew as The Boy
 Jenny Walser as The Girl
 Hugh Train as James

Reception
Overall the show has attracted great acclaim by both audience member and reviewer alike, which has led it to several successful runs. Stephen Fry tweeted that he had "...just been knocked out by The Boy James... Still drying my eyes." and The Stage called it "Belt Up's finest performance.".  In the 2011 presentation The Guardian noted that Wright's play "reaches out for something he can't grasp," and, "the overall effect is of something almost, but not quite, enchanting.". Its Adelaide production was incredibly favoured, spoken of highly by leading publication The Adelaide Advertiser 'its delivery is so disarming, charming and well performed that it is well worth a look'. and by leading theatre critic outlet Adelaide Theatre Guide 'An unsettling, thought-provoking and imaginative work from a theatre company to keep an eye on; here’s hoping they’ll make the Adelaide Fringe a regular destination.'

Notes

2010 plays
English plays
Plays based on real people
Cultural depictions of J. M. Barrie